Zied Ounalli (born 8 February 1994) is a Tunisian professional footballer who plays for CS Chebba as a winger.

On 6 August 2021, Rguiî joined Saudi club Al-Bukiryah.

References

1994 births
Living people
Tunisian footballers
ES Zarzis players
Espérance Sportive de Tunis players
Stade Tunisien players
CA Bizertin players
Al Batin FC players
Al-Kawkab FC players
Al-Tai FC players
Al-Bukayriyah FC players
CS Chebba players
Association football wingers
Tunisian Ligue Professionnelle 1 players
Saudi Professional League players
Saudi First Division League players
Saudi Second Division players
Tunisian expatriate footballers
Expatriate footballers in Saudi Arabia
Tunisian expatriate sportspeople in Saudi Arabia